The 73rd Regiment Illinois Volunteer Infantry, known as the "Persimmon Regiment" or the "Preacher's Regiment" was an infantry regiment that served in the Union Army during the American Civil War.

Service
73rd Regiment Illinois was organized at Camp Butler, Illinois and mustered into Federal service on August 21, 1862.

The regiment was discharged from service on June 10, 1865.

Total strength and casualties
The regiment suffered 5 officers and 109 enlisted men who were killed in action or mortally wounded and 167 enlisted men who died of disease, for a total of 281 fatalities.

Commanders
Colonel James F. Jacquess – Mustered out with the regiment.

See also
List of Illinois Civil War Units
Illinois in the American Civil War

Notes

References
The Civil War Archive

External links
 

Units and formations of the Union Army from Illinois
1862 establishments in Illinois
Military units and formations established in 1862
Military units and formations disestablished in 1865